Lamaing is a village in Madaya Township, Pyin Oo Lwin District, in the Mandalay Region of central Burma. It is located southeast of  Madaya and north of Mandalay, connected along the National Highway 31. On October 1, 1886 there was a reported small native garrison at Lamaing.

References

External links
Maplandia World Gazetteer

Populated places in Pyin Oo Lwin District
Madaya Township